The Federal Woman's Award, also known as the Federal Women's Award, was given by the United States Civil Service Commission from 1961 until 1976.

The Federal Woman's Award was established by Barbara Bates Gunderson in 1960, while she was serving on the Civil Service Commission. Her goal was to publicize the ways women were excelling in federal employment, and to encourage young women to consider careers with federal laboratories and agencies. Gunderson was also the first chair of the award's board. Katie Louchheim, Deputy Assistant Secretary of State for Public Affairs, and later Patricia Hitt, Assistant Secretary of Health, Education, and Welfare, issued press releases about the awards and appeared at the presentation events.

Nominations were submitted annually by federal departments and agencies to the Board of Trustees for the Federal Woman's Award. The nominations were judged by a panel of "persons prominent in public life", including magazine editors, broadcasters, journalists, business executives, and college presidents. Among the judges were Milton S. Eisenhower, Carl Rowan, Doris Fleeson, Arthur Sherwood Flemming, Sol Linowitz, David Brinkley, Betty Furness, and Katharine E. McBride.

About six recipients were selected each year, for their "outstanding achievement and ability in an executive, professional, scientific, or technical position in the federal service." Award winners were invited to a ceremony in the Oval Office. The president posed for official photographs with the group, and made remarks for the occasion.

The awards were discontinued after the 1976 presentations, though there were nominations for 1977. "Although the prize had served its purpose at no cost to the government, its continuation in the era of equal opportunity as a separate compensatory award for women only, which had seemed so harmless and even chivalric before, began to raise concerns and embarrassment," noted historian of science Margaret Rossiter. In 1978, Rosalyn Yalow, one of the award's first recipients, recalled that "I viewed this award as second-class", adding "I was therefore delighted to learn last year that the Federal Woman's Award was to be discontinued — I hope permanently."

Awardees by year

1961 

 Beatrice Aitchison
 Ruth E. Bacon
 Nina Kinsella (Warden of the Federal Reformatory for Women, Alderson, WV)
 Charlotte Moore Sitterly
 Aryness Joy Wickens
 Rosalyn Sussman Yalow

1962 

 Katherine W. Bracken (Director of the Office of Central American and Panamanian Affairs, Department of State)
 Margaret H. Brass (attorney, Department of Justice)
Thelma Brumfield Dunn 
 Evelyn Harrison (Civil Service Commission)
Allene Jeanes
Nancy Roman

1963 

 Eleanor L. Makel
 Bessie Margolin
Katharine Kniskern Mather 
 Verna C. Mohagen (1908-1980; Personnel Management Division, Department of Agriculture)
Blanche W. Noyes
 Eleanor C. Pressly

1964 

 Evelyn Anderson
 Gertrude Blanch
 Selene Gifford 
 Elizabeth F. Messer (Civil Service Commission)
Margaret Wolman Schwartz (specialist in economic warfare, Treasury Department)
 Patricia G. van Delden

1965 

 Ann Z. Caracristi
 Elizabeth B. Drewry
 Dorothy M. Gilford
Carol Laise
Sarah Elizabeth Stewart 
 Penelope Hartland-Thunberg

1966 

 Fannie N. Boyls (1906-2002; National Labor Relations Board)
 Stella E. Davis (Desk officer, East and South Africa, USIA)
Jocelyn Gill
 Ida Craven Merriam
 Irene Parsons (Personnel, Veterans Administration)
 Ruth G. Van Cleve (director, Office of the Territories, Department of Interior)
Also nominated: Julia Brown Wright (US Naval Propellant Plant)

1967 

 Elizabeth Ann Brown
Barbara Moulton
 Anne Mason Roberts 
 Kathryn Grove Shipp
Wilma Victor
 Marjorie J. Williams

1968 

 Ruth R. Benerito
Mabel Kunce Gibby (1926-2015; vocational rehab, psychologist)
Frances M. James (Council of Economic Advisors)
Ruby Grant Martin 
Lucille Farrier Stickel
Rogene L. Thompson (Federal Aviation Administration)
Nina Bencich Woodside

1969 

 Mary Hughes Budenbach
 Edith N. Cook (Associate Solicitor, Division of Legislation, Department of Labor)
 Eileen R. Donovan 
 Jo Ann Smith Kinney (Navy, Submarine Medical Research Lab)
 Esther Christian Lawton
 Dorothy L. Starbuck

1970 

 Jean Apgar
 Margaret Pittman
 Naomi Rosen Sweeney (Office of Management and Budget)
 Sarah B. Glindmeyer (chief of the Bureau of Nursing, D. C. Dept. of Public Health)
 Valerija B. Raulinaitis (hospital director, Veterans Administration)
 Margaret Joy Tibbetts
Also nominated: Marilyn Levy

1971 

 Jeanne Wilson Davis (National Security Council)
 Florence Johnson Hicks (Public Health, Washington DC; 1st black woman graduate of the University of Maryland’s statistics & research doctoral program)
 Juanita Morris Moody 
 Essie Davis Morgan
 Rita Rapp
Joan R. Rosenblatt
Also nominated: Frances L. Whedon, Miriam H. Thomas, Joyce L. House, Joyce I. Allen, Vilma B. Harper, Cleo S. Cason

1972 

 Lois Albro Chatham
 Phyllis Dixon Clemmons (d. 2013; Government of the District of Columbia)
 Ruth M. Davis
 Mary Harrover Ferguson (d. 1999; Office of Naval Research)
Ruth M. Leverton
 Patricia Ann McCreedy

1973 

 Bernice L. Bernstein (HEW)
 Marguerite S. Chang 
 Janet Hart (Federal Reserve)
 Marilyn E. Jacox
 Isabel L. Karle 
 Marjorie R. Townsend

1974 

 Henriette D. Avram 
 Edna A. Boorady (AID, Southeast Asia)
 Roselyn Payne Epps 
 Brigid Gray Leventhal 
 Gladys P. Rogers (Department of State)
 Madge Skelly (VA, audiology)

1975 

 Beatrice Dvorak (Department of Labor)
 Evans Hayward 
 Wilda Martinez (Department of Agriculture)
 Marie U. Nylen  
Also nominated: Theresa V. Brassard

1976

 I. Blanche Bourne (Public Health, Government of the District of Columbia)
 Carin Ann Clauss
 Dorothy I. Fennell (Department of Agriculture)
Marion J. Finkel (FDA)
Mary Patricia Murray (VA, kinesiologist)
Joyce J. Walker (OMB)

1977 
Nominated: Lola McFerson

References 

Civil awards and decorations of the United States